Jiang Yizhen (March 1915 – March 24, 1994) was a People's Republic of China politician. He was born in Liancheng County, Fujian. He was Chinese Communist Party Committee Secretary and Governor of his home province. He was People's Congress Chairman of Hebei.

1915 births
1994 deaths
People's Republic of China politicians from Fujian
Chinese Communist Party politicians from Fujian
Governors of Fujian
People from Liancheng County
Politicians from Longyan